Klang may refer to:

Music
Klang (music), a concept in Riemannian and Schenkerian theories based on the German word Klang, meaning 'resonance' or 'sound
Klang (Stockhausen) (2004–2007), cycle of compositions by Karlheinz Stockhausen
Klang (album), the third studio album by The Rakes
Kling Klang Studio, the private music studio of the band Kraftwerk
Klang Box, a special-edition boxed set compilation of music by Kraftwerk
Kling Klang (band), an experimental rock group
Der ferne Klang, opera by Franz Schreker
Klang, a band formed by Donna Matthews after the breakup of Elastica

Places

Malaysia 
Klang River, river that flows through the state of Selangor and territory of Kuala Lumpur into the strait of Malacca
Klang Valley, district in Selangor surrounding Klang river
Klang (city), the royal capital of the state of Selangor
Klang (federal constituency), represented in the Dewan Rakyat
Klang District, a district that contains the city of Klang, but does not administer it
Ulu Klang
Bandar Klang (state constituency), formerly represented in the Selangor State Legislative Assembly (1974–86; 1995–2004)
New Klang Valley Expressway
Klang Parade
North Klang Straits Bypass
Klang Komuter station
Jalan Klang Lama
Klang Sentral
Duta–Ulu Klang Expressway
Klang–Banting Highway
South Klang Valley Expressway
New North Klang Straits Bypass
Genting Klang–Pahang Highway
Klang Gates Dam
Klang High School
Gurdwara Sahib Klang
Bandar Bukit Tinggi
Pandamaran
Bandar Baru Klang
Port Klang
Port Klang Line
Port Klang Komuter station
Pelabuhan Kelang (federal constituency), represented in the Dewan Rakyat (1974–86)
Pelabuhan Klang (state constituency), represented in the Selangor State Legislative Assembly (1995–present)
Klang War, series of conflicts in the Malay state of Selangor

France 
Klang, Moselle, a commune in the Moselle department in Lorraine in northeastern France

Thailand 
Ban Klang: Ban Klang, San Pa Tong or Ban Klang, Wang Thong
San Klang: San Klang, San Kamphaeng or San Klang, San Pa Tong
Na Klang District
Klang Plaza

People
Donnie Klang (born 1985), singer from New York City and Making the Band 4 contestant
Gary Klang (born 1941), Haitian-Canadian poet and novelist
Klaus Klang (born 1959), musician from Brussels, Belgium

Other uses
Clanging, a psychological phenomenon
Klang Beer, a Cambodian beer
Klang, a Pokémon
Nordischer Klang, the largest festival of Nordic culture in Germany
Rojak Klang
We Are Klang, a comedy sketch group

See also